The 2003 Chicago White Sox season was the White Sox's 104th season. They finished with a record of 86–76, good enough for second place in the American League Central, four games behind the champion Minnesota Twins.

The White Sox also hosted the 74th Major League Baseball All-Star Game on July 15.

Offseason 
 12/3/02: Traded closer Keith Foulke, catcher Mark Johnson, and minor league pitcher Joe Valentine to the Oakland Athletics for closer Billy Koch, minor league pitcher Neal Cotts, and minor league outfielder Daylan Holt.
 12/20/02: Sandy Alomar Jr. was signed as a free agent with the Chicago White Sox.
 1/15/03: Traded relief pitcher Antonio Osuna and minor league pitcher Delvis Lantigua to the New York Yankees for starting pitcher Orlando Hernández. Traded Hernandez, outfielder Jeff Liefer, and relief pitcher Rocky Biddle to the Montreal Expos for starting pitcher Bartolo Colón and minor league infielder Jorge Nunoz.
 1/27/03: Signed free agent starting pitcher Esteban Loaiza to a minor league contract.

Regular season 
On April 15, 2003, a fan came out of the stands during the baseball game between the Kansas City Royals and Chicago White Sox and attacked first base umpire Laz Diaz. After Carlos Lee flied out to right to end the eighth inning, the fan ran on the field and tried to tackle Diaz, wrapping his arms around the umpire's legs.

Season standings

Record vs. opponents

Roster

Opening Day starters

Notable transactions 
 7/1/03 Traded minor league pitchers Edwin Almonte, Royce Ring, and minor league infielder Andrew Salvo to the New York Mets for 2B Roberto Alomar.
 7/1/03 Traded minor league pitchers Frank Francisco, Josh Rupe, and Anthony Webster to the Texas Rangers for CF Carl Everett.
 9/29/03 Fired manager Jerry Manuel.

Game log 

|- style="text-align:center;background-color:#ffbbbb"
| 1 || March 31 || @ Royals || 0–3 || Hernández (1–0) || Buehrle (0–1) || MacDougal (1) || 2:05 || 40,302 || 0–1 || box
|- style="text-align:center;background-color:#ffbbbb"
| 2 || April 2 || @ Royals || 4–5 || López (1–0) || White (0–1) || MacDougal (2) || 2:53 || 10,429 || 0–2 || box
|- style="text-align:center;background-color:#ffbbbb"
| 3 || April 3 || @ Royals || 6–12 || Bukvich (1–0) || Gordon (0–1) || || 3:23 || 9,524 || 0–3 || box
|- style="text-align:center;background-color:#bbffbb"
| 4 || April 4 || Tigers || 5–2 || Loaiza (1–0) || Cornejo (0–1) || Koch (1) || 2:26 || 40,395 || 1–3 || box
|- style="text-align:center;background-color:#bbffbb"
| 5 || April 5 || Tigers || 7–0 || Buehrle (1–1) || Maroth (0–2) || || 2:16 || 16,972 || 2–3 || box
|- style="text-align:center;background-color:#bbffbb"
| 6 || April 6 || Tigers || 10–2 || Marte (1–0) || Germán (0–1) || || 2:59 || 14,514 || 3–3 || box
|- style="text-align:center;background-color:#bbbbbb"
| – || April 7 || @ Indians || colspan=8 | Postponed (rain) Rescheduled for June 2
|- style="text-align:center;background-color:#bbffbb"
| 7 || April 8 || @ Indians || 5 – 3 (10) || Koch (1–0) || Paronto (0–1) || || 3:07 || 42,301 || 4–3 || box
|- style="text-align:center;background-color:#ffbbbb"
| 8 || April 9 || @ Indians || 2–5 || Anderson (2–0) || Garland (0–1) || Báez (3) || 2:25 || 14,841 || 4–4 || box
|- style="text-align:center;background-color:#bbffbb"
| 9 || April 10 || @ Indians || 7–2 || Buehrle (2–1) || Davis (0–2) || || 2:25 || 15,916 || 5–4 || box
|- style="text-align:center;background-color:#bbffbb"
| 10 || April 11 || @ Tigers || 5–0 || Loaiza (2–0) || Bernero (0–2) || || 2:10 || 12,577 || 6–4 || box
|- style="text-align:center;background-color:#ffbbbb"
| 11 || April 12 || @ Tigers || 3–4 || Cornejo (1–1) || Stewart (0–1) || Anderson (1) || 3:03 || 12,985 || 6–5 || box
|- style="text-align:center;background-color:#bbffbb"
| 12 || April 13 || @ Tigers || 3–2 || Colón (1–0) || Knotts (0–1) || Koch (2) || 2:27 || 12,808 || 7–5 || box
|- style="text-align:center;background-color:#ffbbbb"
| 13 || April 15 || Royals || 5–8 || López (2–0) || Koch (1–1) || MacDougal (7) || 3:01 || 20,591 || 7–6 || box
|- style="text-align:center;background-color:#bbffbb"
| 14 || April 16 || Royals || 4–3 || Gordon (1–1) || Grimsley (0–1) || || 2:32 || 9,882 || 8–6 || box
|- style="text-align:center;background-color:#bbffbb"
| 15 || April 17 || Royals || 8–2 || Loaiza (3–0) || George (2–1) || || 2:42 || 10,716 || 9–6 || box
|- style="text-align:center;background-color:#bbffbb"
| 16 || April 18 || Indians || 5–3 || Colón (2–0) || Traber (0–1) || || 2:25 || 13,015 || 10–6 || box
|- style="text-align:center;background-color:#bbffbb"
| 17 || April 19 || Indians || 12–3 || Stewart (1–1) || Anderson (2–2) || || 2:33 || 18,907 || 11–6 || box
|- style="text-align:center;background-color:#ffbbbb"
| 18 || April 20 || Indians || 4–7 || Davis (2–2) || Buehrle (2–2) || || 2:19 || 14,975 || 11–7 || box
|- style="text-align:center;background-color:#ffbbbb"
| 19 || April 21 || Indians || 2–9 || Westbrook (1–2) || Garland (0–2) || || 2:39 || 15,424 || 11–8 || box
|- style="text-align:center;background-color:#bbffbb"
| 20 || April 22 || @ Orioles || 3–1 || Loaiza (4–0) || Ponson (1–2) || Koch (3) || 2:08 || 18,676 || 12–8 || box
|- style="text-align:center;background-color:#ffbbbb"
| 21 || April 23 || @ Orioles || 1–7 || Johnson (3–0) || Colón (2–1) || || 2:48 || 19,908 || 12–9 || box
|- style="text-align:center;background-color:#ffbbbb"
| 22 || April 24 || @ Orioles || 4–5 || Roberts (2–1) || Gordon (1–2) || Julio (6) || 2:46 || 23,731 || 12–10 || box
|- style="text-align:center;background-color:#ffbbbb"
| 23 || April 25 || Twins || 1–6 || Mays (3–2) || Buehrle (2–3) || || 2:22 || 14,285 || 12–11 || box
|- style="text-align:center;background-color:#bbffbb"
| 24 || April 26 || Twins || 7–4 || Garland (1–2) || Lohse (2–3) || || 2:48 || 25,381 || 13–11 || box
|- style="text-align:center;background-color:#bbffbb"
| 25 || April 27 || Twins || 3–1 || Loaiza (5–0) || Reed (1–4) || Marte (1) || 2:00 || 22,714 || 14–11 || box
|- style="text-align:center;background-color:#ffbbbb"
| 26 || April 29 || Athletics || 2–3 || Zito (4–2) || Colón (2–2) || Foulke (7) || 2:30 || 13,936 || 14–12 || box
|- style="text-align:center;background-color:#ffbbbb"
| 27 || April 30 || Athletics || 1–4 || Mulder (4–1) || Buehrle (2–4) || || 1:54 || 11,084 || 14–13 || box

|- style="text-align:center;background-color:#bbffbb"
| 28 || May 1 || Athletics || 7–5 || Garland (2–2) || Halama (1–2) || Marte (2) || 2:57 || 10,639 || 15–13 || box
|- style="text-align:center;background-color:#ffbbbb"
| 29 || May 2 || Mariners || 2–9 || Franklin (2–2) || Loaiza (5–1) || || 2:39 || 13,355 || 15–14 || box
|- style="text-align:center;background-color:#ffbbbb"
| 30 || May 3 || Mariners || 2–12 || García (3–3) || Stewart (1–2) || || 3:16 || 25,837 || 15–15 || box
|- style="text-align:center;background-color:#ffbbbb"
| 31 || May 4 || Mariners || 1 – 5 (6) || Meche (4–1) || Colón (2–3) || || 1:21 || 15,413 || 15–16 || box
|- style="text-align:center;background-color:#ffbbbb"
| 32 || May 6 || @ Athletics || 0–6 || Mulder (5–1) || Buehrle (2–5) || || 1:49 || 10,695 || 15–17 || box
|- style="text-align:center;background-color:#bbffbb"
| 33 || May 7 || @ Athletics || 8–4 || Loaiza (6–1) || Lilly (2–2) || Marte (3) || 3:23 || 20,715 || 16–17 || box
|- style="text-align:center;background-color:#ffbbbb"
| 34 || May 8 || @ Athletics || 5–8 || Halama (2–2) || Garland (2–3) || Foulke (9) || 3:00 || 12,329 || 16–18 || box
|- style="text-align:center;background-color:#ffbbbb"
| 35 || May 9 || @ Mariners || 3–6 || Franklin (3–2) || Wright (0–1) || Nelson (3) || 2:43 || 38,749 || 16–19 || box
|- style="text-align:center;background-color:#bbffbb"
| 36 || May 10 || @ Mariners || 4–3 || Colón (3–3) || Meche (4–2) || Marte (4) || 2:34 || 43,123 || 17–19 || box
|- style="text-align:center;background-color:#ffbbbb"
| 37 || May 11 || @ Mariners || 2–7 || Moyer (5–2) || Buehrle (2–6) || || 2:40 || 45,383 || 17–20 || box
|- style="text-align:center;background-color:#bbffbb"
| 38 || May 13 || Orioles || 1–0 || Loaiza (7–1) || Daal (2–5) || Koch (4) || 2:27 || 14,397 || 18–20 || box
|- style="text-align:center;background-color:#bbffbb"
| 39 || May 14 || Orioles || 5–1 || Gordon (2–2) || Helling (2–4) || || 2:30 || 12,078 || 19–20 || box
|- style="text-align:center;background-color:#bbffbb"
| 40 || May 15 || Orioles || 8–2 || Colón (4–3) || Ponson (4–3) || || 2:49 || 11,886 || 20–20 || box
|- style="text-align:center;background-color:#ffbbbb"
| 41 || May 16 || @ Twins || 3–18 || Radke (5–3) || Buehrle (2–7) || || 2:55 || 22,233 || 20–21 || box
|- style="text-align:center;background-color:#ffbbbb"
| 42 || May 17 || @ Twins || 1–3 || Mays (4–3) || Garland (2–4) || Guardado (9) || 2:20 || 23,209 || 20–22 || box
|- style="text-align:center;background-color:#ffbbbb"
| 43 || May 18 || @ Twins || 2–3 || Hawkins (3–0) || Gordon (2–3) || Guardado (10) || 2:48 || 25,055 || 20–23 || box
|- style="text-align:center;background-color:#ffbbbb"
| 44 || May 19 || Blue Jays || 2–12 || Lidle (7–2) || Wright (0–2) || || 2:52 || 19,628 || 20–24 || box
|- style="text-align:center;background-color:#bbffbb"
| 45 || May 20 || Blue Jays || 4–1 || Colón (5–3) || Davis (1–3) || || 3:01 || 12,857 || 21–24 || box
|- style="text-align:center;background-color:#bbffbb"
| 46 || May 21 || Blue Jays || 6–5 || Marte (2–0) || Politte (1–3) || Koch (5) || 2:53 || 13,076 || 22–24 || box
|- style="text-align:center;background-color:#ffbbbb"
| 47 || May 23 || Tigers || 2–3 || Maroth (1–9) || Gordon (2–4) || Spurling (2) || 2:25 || 15,069 || 22–25 || box
|- style="text-align:center;background-color:#ffbbbb"
| 48 || May 24 || Tigers || 0–1 || Knotts (2–3) || Loaiza (7–2) || Germán (1) || 2:35 || 27,535 || 22–26 || box
|- style="text-align:center;background-color:#bbffbb"
| 49 || May 25 || Tigers || 8 – 5 (12) || Glover (1–0) || Sparks (0–1) || || 3:32 || 21,398 || 23–26 || box
|- style="text-align:center;background-color:#ffbbbb"
| 50 || May 26 || @ Blue Jays || 5–11 || Towers (1–0) || Buehrle (2–8) || Tam (1) || 3:16 || 19,009 || 23–27 || box
|- style="text-align:center;background-color:#ffbbbb"
| 51 || May 27 || @ Blue Jays || 1–5 || Halladay (6–2) || Colón (5–4) || || 2:18 || 19,365 || 23–28 || box
|- style="text-align:center;background-color:#bbffbb"
| 52 || May 28 || @ Blue Jays || 8–0 || Garland (3–4) || Escobar (2–2) || || 2:48 || 36,806 || 24–28 || box
|- style="text-align:center;background-color:#bbffbb"
| 53 || May 29 || @ Blue Jays || 3–2 || Loaiza (8–2) || Lidle (8–3) || Koch (6) || 2:54 || 20,010 || 25–28 || box
|- style="text-align:center;background-color:#ffbbbb"
| 54 || May 30 || @ Indians || 3–7 || Sabathia (4–2) || Wright (0–3) || || 2:57 || 24,666 || 25–29 || box
|- style="text-align:center;background-color:#bbbbbb"
| – || May 31 || @ Indians ||colspan=8| Postponed (rain), rescheduled for July 12

|- style="text-align:center;background-color:#ffbbbb"
| 55 || June 1 || @ Indians || 4 – 5 (10) || Boyd (1–1) || Koch (1–2) || || 2:54 || 22,681 || 25–30 || box
|- style="text-align:center;background-color:#ffbbbb"
| 56 || June 2 || @ Indians || 2–5 || Anderson (3–5) || Colón (5–5) || Báez (11) || 2:40 || 20,892 || 25–31 || box
|- style="text-align:center;background-color:#ffbbbb"
| 57 || June 3 || @ D-backs || 1–2 || Villarreal (4–3) || Gordon (2–5) || || 2:33 || 33,544 || 25–32 || box
|- style="text-align:center;background-color:#ffbbbb"
| 58 || June 4 || @ D-backs || 6–8 || Good (2–1) || Garland (3–5) || Valverde (1) || 2:43 || 26,667 || 25–33 || box
|- style="text-align:center;background-color:#bbffbb"
| 59 || June 5 || @ D-backs || 3 – 2 (10) || Koch (2–2) || Service (0–2) || || 2:50 || 27,747 || 26–33 || box
|- style="text-align:center;background-color:#ffbbbb"
| 60 || June 6 || @ Dodgers || 1–2 || Ishii (5–2) || Buehrle (2–9) || Gagné (21) || 2:20 || 35,503 || 26–34 || box
|- style="text-align:center;background-color:#bbffbb"
| 61 || June 7 || @ Dodgers || 4–1 || Colón (6–5) || Ashby (0–4) || || 2:19 || 44,122 || 27–34 || box
|- style="text-align:center;background-color:#bbffbb"
| 62 || June 8 || @ Dodgers || 10–3 || Loaiza (9–2) || Pérez (4–4) || || 2:41 || 52,637 || 28–34 || box
|- style="text-align:center;background-color:#bbffbb"
| 63 || June 10 || Giants || 5–3 || Garland (4–5) || Nathan (6–3) || || 2:51 || 23,837 || 29–34 || box
|- style="text-align:center;background-color:#ffbbbb"
| 64 || June 11 || Giants || 4–11 || Foppert (4–5) || Buehrle (2–10) || || 2:59 || 19,114 || 29–35 || box
|- style="text-align:center;background-color:#ffbbbb"
| 65 || June 12 || Giants || 4–8 || Nathan (7–3) || Colón (6–6) || || 2:40 || 22,827 || 29–36 || box
|- style="text-align:center;background-color:#bbffbb"
| 66 || June 13 || Padres || 5–3 || Gordon (3–5) || Linebrink (1–2) || Koch (7) || 2:51 || 14,162 || 30–36 || box
|- style="text-align:center;background-color:#bbffbb"
| 67 || June 14 || Padres || 6–5 || Gordon (4–5) || Witasick (0–1) || Koch (8) || 2:51 || 27,287 || 31–36 || box
|- style="text-align:center;background-color:#ffbbbb"
| 68 || June 15 || Padres || 0–1 || Pérez (2–3) || Garland (4–6) || Beck (1) || 2:38 || 26,491 || 31–37 || box
|- style="text-align:center;background-color:#bbffbb"
| 69 || June 16 || Red Sox || 4–2 || Buehrle (3–10) || Rupe (1–1) || Gordon (1) || 2:06 || 30,779 || 32–37 || box
|- style="text-align:center;background-color:#ffbbbb"
| 70 || June 17 || Red Sox || 4–7 || Burkett (5–3) || Colón (6–7) || Lyon (8) || 2:53 || 19,887 || 32–38 || box
|- style="text-align:center;background-color:#bbffbb"
| 71 || June 18 || Red Sox || 3–1 || Loaiza (10–2) || Wakefield (5–3) || Koch (9) || 2:22 || 18,708 || 33–38 || box
|- style="text-align:center;background-color:#ffbbbb"
| 72 || June 19 || Red Sox || 3 – 4 (10) || Lyon (3–3) || Koch (2–3) || || 3:15 || 17,225 || 33–39 || box
|- style="text-align:center;background-color:#bbffbb"
| 73 || June 20 || @ Cubs || 12–3 || Garland (5–6) || Estes (6–6) || || 3:13 || 39,080 || 34–39 || box
|- style="text-align:center;background-color:#bbffbb"
| 74 || June 21 || @ Cubs || 7–6 || Buehrle (4–10) || Clement (5–7) || Koch (10) || 3:13
 || 38,938 || 35–39 || box
|- style="text-align:center;background-color:#ffbbbb"
| 75 || June 22 || @ Cubs || 1–2 || Zambrano (6–6) || Marte (2–1) || Borowski (15) || 2:38 || 38,223 || 35–40 || box
|- style="text-align:center;background-color:#bbffbb"
| 76 || June 24 || @ Twins || 2–1 || Loaiza (11–2) || Reed (3–8) || Koch (11) || 2:28 || 19,229 || 36–40 || box
|- style="text-align:center;background-color:#ffbbbb"
| 77 || June 25 || @ Twins || 5 – 6 (11) || Guardado (1–2) || Koch (2–4) || || 3:20 || 21,338 || 36–41 || box
|- style="text-align:center;background-color:#bbffbb"
| 78 || June 26 || @ Twins || 5–1 || Buehrle (5–10) || Radke (5–7) || || 2:06 || 26,474 || 37–41 || box
|- style="text-align:center;background-color:#bbffbb"
| 79 || June 27 || Cubs || 4–3 || Koch (3–4) || Alfonseca (0–1) || || 2:39 || 45,147 || 38–41 || box
|- style="text-align:center;background-color:#bbffbb"
| 80 || June 28 || Cubs || 7–6 || Koch (4–4) || Cruz (1–3) || || 3:28 || 45,440 || 39–41 || box
|- style="text-align:center;background-color:#ffbbbb"
| 81 || June 29 || Cubs || 2–5 || Wood (8–5) || Loaiza (11–3) || || 2:47 || 44,858 || 39–42 || box
|- style="text-align:center;background-color:#bbffbb"
| 82 || June 30 || Twins || 10–3 || Garland (6–6) || Mays (8–5) || || 2:37 || 29,945 || 40–42 || box

|- style="text-align:center;background-color:#bbffbb"
| 83 || July 1 || Twins || 6–1 || Buehrle (6–10) || Radke (5–8) || || 2:27 || 30,694 || 41–42 || box
|- style="text-align:center;background-color:#bbffbb"
| 84 || July 2 || Twins || 8 – 6 (12) || Koch (5–4) || Guardado (1–3) || || 3:37 || 19,555 || 42–42 || box
|- style="text-align:center;background-color:#ffbbbb"
| 85 || July 4 || @ Devil Rays || 3–4 || Colomé (2–4) || Koch (5–5) || || 2:40 || 9,493 || 42–43 || box
|- style="text-align:center;background-color:#ffbbbb"
| 86 || July 5 || @ Devil Rays || 2–3 || Sosa (2–6) || Loaiza (11–4) || Carter (14) || 2:48 || 13,365 || 42–44 || box
|- style="text-align:center;background-color:#bbffbb"
| 87 || July 6 || @ Devil Rays || 11–3 || Buehrle (7–10) || Standridge (0–4) || || 2:28 || 11,683 || 43–44 || box
|- style="text-align:center;background-color:#ffbbbb"
| 88 || July 8 || @ Tigers || 1–2 || Spurling (1–1) || Garland (6–7) || Mears (1) || 2:19 || 13,643 || 43–45 || box
|- style="text-align:center;background-color:#ffbbbb"
| 89 || July 9 || @ Tigers || 2–4 || Bonderman (3–13) || Colón (6–8) || Mears (2) || 2:24 || 12,869 || 43–46 || box
|- style="text-align:center;background-color:#ffbbbb"
| 90 || July 10 || @ Tigers || 0–1 || Cornejo (4–7) || Loaiza (11–5) || Mears (3) || 2:04 || 18,206 || 43–47 || box
|- style="text-align:center;background-color:#ffbbbb"
| 91 || July 11 || @ Indians || 5–12 || Anderson (7–6) || Wright (0–4) || || 2:50 || 27,712 || 43–48 || box
|- style="text-align:center;background-color:#bbffbb"
| 92 || July 12 || @ Indians || 7 – 4 (10) || Marte (3–1) || Mulholland (1–2) || Gordon (2) || 3:00 || 24,163 || 44–48 || box
|- style="text-align:center;background-color:#ffbbbb"
| 93 || July 12 || @ Indians || 2–4 || Westbrook (4–4) || Porzio (0–1) || Báez (21) || 2:36 || 27,165 || 44–49 || box
|- style="text-align:center;background-color:#bbffbb"
| 94 || July 13 || @ Indians || 7–4 || Marte (4–1) || Betancourt (0–1) || Gordon (3) || 3:11 || 26,467 || 45–49 || box
|- style="text-align:center;"
|colspan="11" style="background-color:#bbcaff" | All-Star Break: AL defeats NL 7–6 at U.S. Cellular Field
|- style="text-align:center;background-color:#ffbbbb"
| 95 || July 17 || Tigers || 9–10 || Maroth (5–13) || Colón (6–9) || || 3:17 || 17,060 || 45–50 || box
|- style="text-align:center;background-color:#bbffbb"
| 96 || July 18 || Tigers || 7–5 || Buehrle (8–10) || Roney (1–4) || Gordon (4) || 2:25 || 18,868 || 46–50 || box
|- style="text-align:center;background-color:#bbffbb"
| 97 || July 19 || Tigers || 6–2 || Garland (7–7) || Cornejo (4–8) || Marte (5) || 2:31 || 32,245 || 47–50 || box
|- style="text-align:center;background-color:#bbffbb"
| 98 || July 20 || Tigers || 10–1 || Loaiza (12–5) || Ledezma (3–3) || || 2:27 || 20,631 || 48–50 || box
|- style="text-align:center;background-color:#bbffbb"
| 99 || July 21 || Indians || 4–3 || Porzio (1–1) || Tallet (0–2) || Gordon (5) || 2:40 || 31,776 || 49–50 || box
|- style="text-align:center;background-color:#bbffbb"
| 100 || July 22 || Indians || 5–2 || Colón (7–9) || Davis (7–8) || Marte (6) || 2:25 || 20,667 || 50–50 || box
|- style="text-align:center;background-color:#bbffbb"
| 101 || July 23 || @ Blue Jays || 7–6 || White (1–1) || Acevedo (1–4) || Marte (7) || 3:03 || 20,320 || 51–50 || box
|- style="text-align:center;background-color:#bbffbb"
| 102 || July 24 || @ Blue Jays || 4 – 3 (13) || Gordon (5–5) || Sturtze (6–5) || White (1) || 4:12 || 18,438 || 52–50 || box
|- style="text-align:center;background-color:#bbffbb"
| 103 || July 25 || Devil Rays || 7–2 || Loaiza (13–5) || Sosa (3–8) || || 2:49 || 22,617 || 53–50 || box
|- style="text-align:center;background-color:#ffbbbb"
| 104 || July 26 || Devil Rays || 6–10 || Malaska (1–0) || White (1–2) || Colomé (1) || 3:07 || 29,633 || 53–51 || box
|- style="text-align:center;background-color:#bbffbb"
| 105 || July 27 || Devil Rays || 9–1 || Colón (8–9) || Kennedy (3–8) || || 2:29 || 28,027 || 54–51 || box
|- style="text-align:center;background-color:#bbffbb"
| 106 || July 29 || @ Royals || 9–6 || Buehrle (9–10) || May (5–5) || Gordon (6) || 2:52 || 24,485 || 55–51 || box
|- style="text-align:center;background-color:#bbffbb"
| 107 || July 30 || @ Royals || 15–4 || Garland (8–7) || Hernández (5–4) || || 3:10 || 20,722 || 56–51 || box
|- style="text-align:center;background-color:#bbffbb"
| 108 || July 31 || @ Royals || 8 – 6 (11) || Schoeneweis (2–1) || Field (1–1) || || 3:35 || 21,352 || 57–51 || box

|- style="text-align:center;background-color:#bbffbb"
| 109 || August 1 || @ Mariners || 12–1 || Colón (9–9) || García (9–11) || || 2:52 || 39,337 || 58–51 || box
|- style="text-align:center;background-color:#ffbbbb"
| 110 || August 2 || @ Mariners || 0–10 || Franklin (8–9) || Wright (0–5) || || 2:22 || 45,719 || 58–52 || box
|- style="text-align:center;background-color:#ffbbbb"
| 111 || August 3 || @ Mariners || 2–8 || Meche (12–7) || Buehrle (9–11) || || 2:57 || 45,632 || 58–53 || box
|- style="text-align:center;background-color:#ffbbbb"
| 112 || August 4 || Royals || 9–13 || Hernández (6–4) || Schoeneweis (2–2) || Levine (1) || 3:26 || 43,922 || 58–54 || box
|- style="text-align:center;background-color:#bbffbb"
| 113 || August 5 || Royals || 5–4 || Loaiza (14–5) || Snyder (1–6) || Marte (8) || 2:58 || 38,973 || 59–54 || box
|- style="text-align:center;background-color:#bbffbb"
| 114 || August 6 || Royals || 4–3 || Colón (10–9) || Wilson (5–2) || Marte (9) || 2:55 || 25,348 || 60–54 || box
|- style="text-align:center;background-color:#bbffbb"
| 115 || August 8 || Athletics || 3–2 || Buehrle (10–11) || Mulder (15–8) || || 1:53 || 24,118 || 61–54 || box
|- style="text-align:center;background-color:#ffbbbb"
| 116 || August 9 || Athletics || 2–7 || Bradford (6–3) || Garland (8–8) || || 3:01 || 36,151 || 61–55 || box
|- style="text-align:center;background-color:#bbffbb"
| 117 || August 10 || Athletics || 5–1 || Loaiza (15–5) || Harden (3–1) || || 2:45 || 29,442 || 62–55 || box
|- style="text-align:center;background-color:#ffbbbb"
| 118 || August 11 || @ Angels || 8–10 || Weber (3–1) || Colón (10–10) || || 3:13 || 35,889 || 62–56 || box
|- style="text-align:center;background-color:#bbffbb"
| 119 || August 12 || @ Angels || 10–4 || Wright (1–5) || Ortiz (13–10) || || 3:17 || 36,458 || 63–56 || box
|- style="text-align:center;background-color:#ffbbbb"
| 120 || August 13 || @ Angels || 1–2 || Rodríguez (6–2) || Buehrle (10–12) || Percival (24) || 2:27 || 37,563 || 63–57 || box
|- style="text-align:center;background-color:#ffbbbb"
| 121 || August 14 || @ Angels || 1–5 || Shields (3–3) || Garland (8–9) || Percival (25) || 2:46 || 35,056 || 63–58 || box
|- style="text-align:center;background-color:#ffbbbb"
| 122 || August 15 || @ Rangers || 5–11 || Lewis (6–7) || Loaiza (15–6) || || 2:46 || 21,186 || 63–59 || box
|- style="text-align:center;background-color:#ffbbbb"
| 123 || August 16 || @ Rangers || 8–12 || Benoit (8–5) || Colón (10–11) || || 2:50 || 40,072 || 63–60 || box
|- style="text-align:center;background-color:#ffbbbb"
| 124 || August 17 || @ Rangers || 4–6 || Powell (3–0) || Marte (4–2) || Cordero (11) || 2:46 || 17,015 || 63–61 || box
|- style="text-align:center;background-color:#bbffbb"
| 125 || August 18 || Angels || 4–2 || Gordon (6–5) || Washburn (9–12) || || 2:07 || 32,381 || 64–61 || box
|- style="text-align:center;background-color:#bbffbb"
| 126 || August 19 || Angels || 5–2 || Garland (9–9) || Shields (3–4) || Gordon (7) || 2:31 || 22,396 || 65–61 || box
|- style="text-align:center;background-color:#bbffbb"
| 127 || August 20 || Angels || 5–3 || Loaiza (16–6) || Lackey (8–12) || Marte (10) || 2:49 || 17,879 || 66–61 || box
|- style="text-align:center;background-color:#bbffbb"
| 128 || August 21 || Rangers || 7–3 || Colón (11–11) || Lewis (6–8) || Gordon (8) || 2:48 || 18,305 || 67–61 || box
|- style="text-align:center;background-color:#bbffbb"
| 129 || August 22 || Rangers || 7–1 || Cotts (1–0) || Dominguez (0–2) || || 2:34 || 36,311 || 68–61 || box
|- style="text-align:center;background-color:#bbffbb"
| 130 || August 23 || Rangers || 13–2 || Buehrle (11–12) || Valdez (7–8) || Wright (1) || 2:22 || 33,721 || 69–61 || box
|- style="text-align:center;background-color:#ffbbbb"
| 131 || August 24 || Rangers || 0–5 || Thomson (12–10) || Garland (9–10) || || 2:26 || 29,364 || 69–62 || box
|- style="text-align:center;background-color:#bbffbb"
| 132 || August 26 || @ Yankees || 13–2 || Loaiza (17–6) || Clemens (12–8) || || 2:59 || 38,884 || 70–62 || box
|- style="text-align:center;background-color:#bbffbb"
| 133 || August 27 || @ Yankees || 11–2 || Colón (12–11) || Wells (12–5) || || 3:09 || 40,654 || 71–62 || box
|- style="text-align:center;background-color:#ffbbbb"
| 134 || August 28 || @ Yankees || 5–7 || Mussina (15–7) || Cotts (1–1) || Rivera (29) || 3:11 || 40,569 || 71–63 || box
|- style="text-align:center;background-color:#ffbbbb"
| 135 || August 29 || @ Tigers || 4–8 || Robertson (1–0) || Buehrle (11–13) || || 2:44 || 15,828 || 71–64 || box
|- style="text-align:center;background-color:#bbffbb"
| 136 || August 30 || @ Tigers || 5–2 || Garland (10–10) || Maroth (6–19) || || 2:44 || 15,786 || 72–64 || box
|- style="text-align:center;background-color:#bbffbb"
| 137 || August 31 || @ Tigers || 6–1 || Loaiza (18–6) || Cornejo (6–14) || || 2:28 || 15,873 || 73–64 || box

|- style="text-align:center;background-color:#ffbbbb"
| 138 || September 2 || Red Sox || 1–2 || Burkett (10–7) || Colón (12–12) || Kim (12) || 2:41 || 23,943 || 73–65 || box
|- style="text-align:center;background-color:#ffbbbb"
| 139 || September 3 || Red Sox || 4 – 5 (10) || Kim (8–9) || Gordon (6–6) || || 3:14 || 20,082 || 73–66 || box
|- style="text-align:center;background-color:#bbffbb"
| 140 || September 5 || Indians || 5–3 || Garland (11–10) || Traber (6–8) || Gordon (9) || 2:50 || 27,196 || 74–66 || box
|- style="text-align:center;background-color:#bbffbb"
| 141 || September 6 || Indians || 8–5 || Loaiza (19–6) || Cressend (2–1) || Gordon (10) || 2:49 || 24,796 || 75–66 || box
|- style="text-align:center;background-color:#bbffbb"
| 142 || September 7 || Indians || 7–3 || Schoeneweis (3–2) || Báez (1–8) || || 2:56 || 19,999 || 76–66 || box
|- style="text-align:center;background-color:#bbffbb"
| 143 || September 8 || Twins || 5–2 || Colón (13–12) || Lohse (12–11) || || 2:42 || 32,807 || 77–66 || box
|- style="text-align:center;background-color:#bbffbb"
| 144 || September 9 || Twins || 8–6 || Buehrle (12–13) || Pulido (0–1) || Gordon (11) || 3:18 || 27,623 || 78–66 || box
|- style="text-align:center;background-color:#ffbbbb"
| 145 || September 10 || Twins || 1–4 || Santana (10–3) || Garland (11–11) || Guardado (34) || 2:54 || 22,188 || 78–67 || box
|- style="text-align:center;background-color:#ffbbbb"
| 146 || September 11 || Twins || 2–5 || Radke (12–10) || Loaiza (19–7) || || 2:30 || 20,541 || 78–68 || box
|- style="text-align:center;background-color:#ffbbbb"
| 147 || September 12 || @ Red Sox || 4–7 || Suppan (12–9) || Wright (1–6) || Kim (13) || 3:14 || 34,890 || 78–69 || box
|- style="text-align:center;background-color:#bbffbb"
| 148 || September 13 || @ Red Sox || 3–1 || Colón (14–12) || Wakefield (10–7) || || 2:21 || 34,414 || 79–69 || box
|- style="text-align:center;background-color:#bbffbb"
| 149 || September 14 || @ Red Sox || 7–2 || Buehrle (13–13) || Burkett (10–8) || Marte (11) || 2:36 || 34,174 || 80–69 || box
|- style="text-align:center;background-color:#ffbbbb"
| 150 || September 16 || @ Twins || 2–5 || Radke (13–10) || Loaiza (19–8) || || 2:51 || 32,921 || 80–70 || box
|- style="text-align:center;background-color:#ffbbbb"
| 151 || September 17 || @ Twins || 2–4 || Rogers (12–8) || Garland (11–12) || Guardado (37) || 2:39 || 40,304 || 80–71 || box
|- style="text-align:center;background-color:#ffbbbb"
| 152 || September 18 || @ Twins || 3–5 || Lohse (14–11) || Colón (14–13) || Guardado (38) || 2:55 || 39,948 || 80–72 || box
|- style="text-align:center;background-color:#bbffbb"
| 153 || September 19 || Royals || 8–5 || Buehrle (14–13) || Carrasco (6–5) || Gordon (12) || 2:21 || 32,812 || 81–72 || box
|- style="text-align:center;background-color:#ffbbbb"
| 154 || September 20 || Royals || 1–7 || Anderson (13–11) || Loaiza (19–9) || || 2:36 || 37,367 || 81–73 || box
|- style="text-align:center;background-color:#ffbbbb"
| 155 || September 21 || Royals || 4–10 || May (10–7) || Garland (11–13) || || 2:31 || 31,539 || 81–74 || box
|- style="text-align:center;background-color:#bbffbb"
| 156 || September 22 || Yankees || 6 – 3 (10) || Gordon (7–6) || White (5–1) || || 3:21 || 39,627 || 82–74 || box
|- style="text-align:center;background-color:#ffbbbb"
| 157 || September 23 || Yankees || 0–7 || Contreras (7–2) || Buehrle (14–14) || || 2:48 || 31,305 || 82–75 || box
|- style="text-align:center;background-color:#bbffbb"
| 158 || September 24 || Yankees || 9–4 || Loaiza (20–9) || Mussina (17–8) || || 2:45 || 26,019 || 83–75 || box
|- style="text-align:center;background-color:#ffbbbb"
| 159 || September 25 || @ Royals || 3–7 || Anderson (14–11) || Wright (1–7) || || 2:06 || 16,438 || 83–76 || box
|- style="text-align:center;background-color:#bbffbb"
| 160 || September 26 || @ Royals || 11–2 || Garland (12–13) || May (10–8) || || 2:22 || 36,598 || 84–76 || box
|- style="text-align:center;background-color:#bbffbb"
| 161 || September 27 || @ Royals || 19–3 || Colón (15–13) || Wright (1–2) || || 2:41 || 37,567 || 85–76 || box
|- style="text-align:center;background-color:#bbffbb"
| 162 || September 28 || @ Royals || 5–1 || Loaiza (21–9) || Lima (8–3) || || 2:19 || 26,261 || 86–76 || box

Player stats

Batting 
Note: G = Games played; AB = At bats; R = Runs scored; H = Hits; 2B = Doubles; 3B = Triples; HR = Home runs; RBI = Runs batted in; BB = Base on balls; SO = Strikeouts; AVG = Batting average; SB = Stolen bases

Pitching 
Note: W = Wins; L = Losses; ERA = Earned run average; G = Games pitched; GS = Games started; SV = Saves; IP = Innings pitched; H = Hits allowed; R = Runs allowed; ER = Earned runs allowed; HR = Home runs allowed; BB = Walks allowed; K = Strikeouts

Farm system 

LEAGUE CHAMPIONS: Winston-Salem

References

External links 
 2003 Chicago White Sox at Baseball Reference

Chicago White Sox seasons
Chicago White Sox season
White